
Taian, Tai-an, or Tai'an may refer to:

Japan
Tai-an (待庵), a chashitsu tea room at Myōki-an temple, Japan, famous for its connection with Sen no Rikyū, designated a National Treasure 
Taian, a day of Rokuyō in the Japanese calendar

Places
Tai'an, a prefecture-level city in Shandong, China
Tai'an County, a county in Liaoning, China
Tai'an Subdistrict (太安街道), a subdistrict in Xi'an District, Liaoyuan, Jilin, China
Tai'an Village, in Beiwan, Jingyuan, Baiyin, Gansu, China

Places in Taiwan
Tai-an, Miaoli, a township in eastern Miaoli County, Taiwan
Tai'an Station (Taichung), a railway station in Taichung, Taiwan

Towns in People's Republic of China
Tai'an, Wanzhou District, Chongqing (太安), in Wanzhou District, Chongqing
Tai'an, Tongnan District, Chongqing (太安), in Tongnan District, Chongqing
Tai'an, Jiangsu (泰安), in Yangzhou, Jiangsu
Tai'an, Shaanxi (太安), in Yijun County, Shaanxi
Tai'an, Luzhou (泰安), in Luzhou, Sichuan
Tai'an, Zhongjiang County (太安), in Zhongjiang County, Sichuan

Townships in People's Republic of China
Tai'an Township, Jilin (太安乡), in Yushu, Jilin
Tai'an Township, Sichuan (太安乡), in Neijiang, Sichuan
Tai'an Township, Yunnan (太安乡), in Yulong Naxi Autonomous County, Yunnan

Historical eras
Tai'an (302–303), era name used by Emperor Hui of Jin
Tai'an (385–386), era name used by Fu Pi, emperor of Former Qin, later continued by Lü Guang (emperor of Later Liang) until 389
Tai'an (455–459), era name used by Emperor Wencheng of Northern Wei
Tai'an (492–505), era name used by Yujiulü Nagai, khan of Rouran